Diomidis Symeonidis (1908 – 24 April 1981) was a Cypriot footballer, one of the founders of APOEL.

Symeonidis was born in 1908 and was, along with his brother Christos, a footballer of Aetos - a local Nicosia club - until 1926 when he met Georgios Poulias. The two men founded POEL which evolved into APOEL. Symeonidis played for the team he co-founded until 1929 when he transferred to Panathinaikos in the Greek League. His career at PAO ended in 1934 due to an injury and Symeonidis returned to Cyprus where he was player/coach for APOEL until 1936.

During his career, Symeonidis was capped 5 times by the National Football Team of Greece. He died in 1981 in his late 70s.

External links
apoel.net

1908 births
1981 deaths
Cypriot footballers
Greek footballers
Greece international footballers
APOEL FC players
Panathinaikos F.C. players
Association footballers not categorized by position
Sportspeople from Nicosia